Rosalind Halstead (born 18 July 1984) is an English actress and model.

Early life
Halstead was born in Islington, London, England. As a youth, she trained for five years at the Central School of Ballet, and danced at Sadler's Wells Theatre. Her performance career began at the North London Performing Arts Centre at the age of eight.

By the age of 13, Halstead was scouted by the Select Modelling Agency, and was a model for some years before becoming an actress.

Career
She appeared in the 2005 film Mrs Henderson Presents. The same year Halstead was cast in David Leland's Virgin Territory (originally titled The Decameron) which was produced by Dino De Laurentis. In 2007 she appeared in the recurring role of Kelly Short on the British television series Nearly Famous.

In 2009, she appeared as Isabella in a televised adaptation of Wuthering Heights on ITV1. In 2010, she appeared in the BBC comedy series How Not To Live Your Life playing a homeless woman who begins dating Don, the show's central character.

In 2014 Halstead joined the cast of the Syfy fantasy television series Dominion during its first season, playing the role of Sen. Becca Thorn.

Filmography

Film

Television

References

External links

Mrs Henderson Presents website

1984 births
English female dancers
English film actresses
English television actresses
Living people